Havering London Borough Council is the local authority for the London Borough of Havering in Greater London, England. It is a London borough council, one of 32 in the United Kingdom capital of London. Havering is divided into 18 wards, each electing three councillors. Since May 2018, Havering London Borough Council has been in no overall control. It comprises 25 Conservative Party members, 23 Havering Residents Association members, 5 Labour Party members and 1 Independent member. The council was created by the London Government Act 1963 and replaced two local authorities: Hornchurch Urban District Council and Romford Borough Council.

History
There have previously been a number of local authorities responsible for the Havering area. The current local authority was first elected in 1964, a year before formally coming into its powers and prior to the creation of the London Borough of Havering on 1 April 1965. Havering replaced Hornchurch Urban District Council and Romford Borough Council. Romford was governed by Romford Urban District Council from 1894 to 1937 and it replaced Noak Hill Parish Council, Havering-atte-Bower Parish Council and Romford Rural District Council in 1934 when the urban district was expanded. Hornchurch Urban District Council was formed in 1926 and replaced Hornchurch Parish Council and Romford Rural District Council in the parish of Hornchurch. In 1934 the urban district was expanded and the council replaced Romford Rural District Council, Cranham Parish Council, Great Warley Parish Council, Rainham Parish Council, Upminster Parish Council and Wennington Parish Council.

It was envisaged that through the London Government Act 1963 Havering as a London local authority would share power with the Greater London Council. The split of powers and functions meant that the Greater London Council was responsible for "wide area" services such as fire, ambulance, flood prevention, and refuse disposal; with the local authorities responsible for "personal" services such as social care, libraries, cemeteries and refuse collection. As an outer London borough council it has been an education authority since 1965. This arrangement lasted until 1986 when Havering London Borough Council gained responsibility for some services that had been provided by the Greater London Council, such as waste disposal. From 1986 to 2000, the London Planning Advisory Committee was run from within the council. Since 2000 the Greater London Authority has taken some responsibility for highways and planning control from the council, but within the English local government system the council remains a "most purpose" authority in terms of the available range of powers and functions.

Powers and functions
The local authority derives its powers and functions from the London Government Act 1963 and subsequent legislation, and has the powers and functions of a London borough council. It sets council tax and as a billing authority also collects precepts for Greater London Authority functions and business rates. It sets planning policies which complement Greater London Authority and national policies, and decides on almost all planning applications accordingly.  It is a local education authority  and is also responsible for council housing, social services, libraries, waste collection and disposal, traffic, and most roads and environmental health.

Elections
''For historic elections and past leadership of the council, see Havering London Borough Council elections

Electoral arrangements

Wards were established for Havering when it came into existence on 1 April 1965. The first elections of ward councillors took place in 1964. These boundaries were also used for the 1968, 1971 and 1974 elections. For the 1978 elections the ward boundaries were revised. These boundaries were then also used at the 1982, 1986 and 1990 elections.

For the May 1994 elections there were minor adjustments to London borough boundaries, which affected the area and population of some Havering wards. These boundaries were also used at the 1998 elections. The current ward boundaries came into effect at the May 2002 elections. They were also used at the 2006, 2010 and 2014 elections.

Leadership
The London Borough of Havering is led by the Leader of the Council and an appointed cabinet formed from the party with majority control of the council. The leader is elected by fellow councillors once every four years following local elections (since 2010, previously annually, with the cabinet being directly appointed by the leader). The current leader is Ray Morgon who has held the position since 2022.

Cabinet
The current composition of Havering Council's Cabinet is as follows.

Mayor

The mayor for 2020/2021 municipal year is John Mylod.

Controversies 
The council's leader, Cllr Damian White, was secretly recorded outlining plans to modify ward boundaries intended to give political advantage to the Conservative party, reported Private Eye in July 2020.  The recording was attributed to a "disgruntled" Tory councillor, Bob Perry, who quit shortly after, citing the group's "dictatorial behaviour". The scheme was reported to involve splitting areas unlikely to vote Conservative into wards with large populations, while merging areas with Conservative support into wards with few residents.  Where unpopular development projects were located, new boundaries would be drawn intending to divide anti-Tory vote into multiple wards to minimise its overall impact.

In the recording, Cllr White reportedly claimed council chief executive, Andrew Blake-Herbert, had supported White's "influence" of the newly defined boundaries, and had selected a Tory-controlled committee to review all boundary change options put forward by council officers and to select their preferred one to take to a full council meeting.  White reportedly went on to say the Boundary Commission had so few staff it was "highly unlikely they'll put in the effort" to scrutinise the changes and that "They only look at what was discussed ... at the full council meeting. So there will be only one option.".  The council's press office denied "any suggestion the chief executive was influenced in any way".  Despite this denial, after a complaint by Labour MP John Cruddas, the council's monitoring officer agreed to an investigation by a "senior figure from another council".

References

Local authorities in London
London borough councils
Politics of the London Borough of Havering
Leader and cabinet executives
Local education authorities in England
Billing authorities in England